Le Pavillon d'Armide is a ballet in one act and three scenes choreographed by Michel Fokine with music by Nikolai Tcherepnin to a libretto by Alexandre Benois. It was inspired by the novella Omphale by Théophile Gautier.

History
The work was first presented on 25 November 1907 at the Mariinsky Theatre in Saint Petersburg, with staging and costumes by Alexandre Benois.  Principal dancers were Anna Pavlova in the role of Armida, Vaslav Nijinsky as her slave, and Pavel Gerdt as the Vicomte René de Beaugency.

On 19 May 1909, the ballet was presented by Sergei Diaghilev's Ballets Russes at the Théâtre du Châtelet, Paris. The role of Armida was danced by Vera Karalli, the Vicomte de Beaugency by Mikhail Mordkin, and the Slave by Nijinsky.  As the first ballet presented in Paris by Diaghilev, its success was due in part to its French theme. The 1909 season also included works based on Russian folklore which also met with public approval.

References

Ballets Russes productions
Ballets by Michel Fokine
Ballets by Nikolai Tcherepnin
1907 ballet premieres
Ballets based on works by Théophile Gautier